Carex cephalophora, called the oval-leaf sedge, oval-headed sedge, woodbank sedge, and short-headed bracted sedge, is a species of flowering plant in the genus Carex, native to the central and eastern United States and southeastern Canada, and introduced to Germany. It is found in late-succession old fields, even those that have become shaded woodlands.

References

cephalophora
Flora of Canada
Flora of the United States
Plants described in 1805